Elizabeth North is a northern suburb of Adelaide.

Elizabeth North may refer to:

 Elizabeth North railway station, former name of railway station Broadmeadows railway station in Adelaide
 Elizabeth North (Scandal), character in American television show Scandal
 North Elizabeth station, NJ Transit station on the Northeast Corridor in Elizabeth, New Jersey